South Cove may refer to the following places:
South Cove, Boston, former name for an area of Bay Village, Boston, Massachusetts
South Cove, Lake Mead, on the Arizona side of the reservoir
South Cove, Suffolk, village and parish in the United Kingdom